α-Ketoisovaleric acid is an organic compound with the formula (CH3)2CHC(O)CO2H.  It is a ketoacid.  With a melting point just above room temperature, it is usually an oil or semi-solid.  The compound is colorless. It is a metabolite of valine and a precursor to pantothenic acid, a prosthetic group found in several cofactors.  In the biological context, is usually encountered as its conjugate base ketoisovalerate, (CH3)2CHC(O)CO2−.

Synthesis and reactions
α-Ketoisovalerate undergoes hydroxymethylation to give ketopantoate:
(CH3)2CHC(O)CO2− + CH2O  →  HOCH2(CH3)2CC(O)CO2−
This conversion is catalyzed by ketopantoate hydroxymethyltransferase.

Like many α-ketoacids, α-ketoisovaleric acid is prone to decarboxylation to give isobutyraldehyde:
(CH3)2CHC(O)CO2H  →  (CH3)2CHCHO  +  CO2
Genetic engineering has been used to produce the biofuel isobutanol by reduction of isobutyraldehyde obtained from ketoisovalerate.

See also
 α-Ketovaleric acid

References

Alpha-keto acids